Patrick George Troughton (25 March 1920 – 28 March 1987) was an English actor best known for his roles in television and film. He played the second incarnation of the Doctor in the long-running British science-fiction television series Doctor Who from 1966 to 1969; he reprised the role in 1972–1973, 1983 and 1985. His other work included appearances in several fantasy, science fiction and horror productions including The Omen (1976) and The Box of Delights (1984).

Early life
Troughton was born on 25 March 1920 in Mill Hill, Middlesex, England, to Alec George Troughton (1887–1953), a solicitor, and Dorothy Evelyn Offord (1886–1979), who married in 1914 in Edmonton. Patrick had an elder brother, Alec Robert (1915–1994), and a younger sister, Mary Edith (1923–2005). Troughton attended Mill Hill School and continued to live in Mill Hill for most of his life. While at Mill Hill School, he acted in a production of J. B. Priestley's Bees on the Boat Deck in March 1937.

Troughton studied at the Embassy School of Acting at Swiss Cottage, being tutored by Eileen Thorndike. He was later awarded an acting scholarship at the Leighton Rallius Studios at the John Drew Memorial Theatre on Long Island, New York, in the United States.

When the Second World War broke out, he abandoned his studies in the U.S. and returned to Great Britain to enlist. During the passage across the North Atlantic Ocean, the ship carrying him struck a sea mine off the coast of Britain, from which he escaped in a lifeboat as the vessel foundered. On arrival back in England, whilst waiting to join the Armed Forces, he briefly worked with the Tonbridge Repertory Company.

In 1940, Troughton enlisted with the Royal Navy, receiving a commission with the Royal Navy Volunteer Reserve in November 1941. He was deployed on East Coast Convoy duty from February to August 1941, and then with Coastal Forces' Motor Gun Boats based at Great Yarmouth from November 1942 to 1945, operating in the North Sea and English Channel. During his service with the MGBs, he was on one occasion involved in an action against Kriegsmarine E-boats which resulted in one of the enemy craft being destroyed by ramming, whilst Troughton's boat and another destroyed two more with their gunfire. His decorations included the 1939–45 Star, the Atlantic Star, and was mentioned in dispatches "for outstanding courage, leadership and skill in many daring attacks on enemy shipping in hostile waters". He used to wear a tea cosy on his head in cold weather in the North Sea.

Career

Early career

After demobilisation, Troughton returned to the theatre. He worked with the Amersham Repertory Company, the Bristol Old Vic Company and the Pilgrim Players at the Mercury Theatre, Notting Hill Gate. He made his television debut in 1947. In 1948, Troughton made his cinema debut with small roles in Olivier's Hamlet, the Joseph L. Mankiewicz directed Escape (one of the stars of which was William Hartnell), and a minor role as a pirate in Disney's Treasure Island (1950), appearing only during the attack on the heroes' hut. Television though, was his favourite medium. In 1953, he became the first actor to play the folk hero Robin Hood on television, starring in six half-hour episodes broadcast from 17 March to 21 April on the BBC, and titled simply Robin Hood. Troughton would also make an appearance in The Adventures of Robin Hood starring Richard Greene. He appeared as the murderer Tyrrell in Olivier's film of Richard III (1955). He was also Olivier's understudy on the film and appears in many long shots as Richard.

Troughton's other notable film and television roles included Kettle in Chance of a Lifetime (1950), Sir Andrew Ffoulkes in The Scarlet Pimpernel (1955), Vickers in the episode entitled "Strange Partners" in The Invisible Man (1958, the series also featured one of his future Doctor Who co-stars, Deborah Watling, as Sally), Phineus in Jason and the Argonauts (1963), Paul of Tarsus (BBC 1960, title role), Dr. Finlay's Casebook (BBC 1962, semi-regular), and Quilp in The Old Curiosity Shop (1962–63). He voiced Winston Smith in a 1965 BBC Home Service radio adaptation of Nineteen Eighty-Four. Prior to Doctor Who he appeared in numerous TV shows, including The Count of Monte Cristo, Ivanhoe, Dial 999, Danger Man, Maigret, Compact, The Third Man, Crane, Detective, Sherlock Holmes, No Hiding Place, The Saint, Armchair Theatre, The Wednesday Play, Z-Cars, Adam Adamant Lives! and Softly, Softly.

Troughton was offered the part of Johnny Ringo in the Doctor Who story The Gunfighters but turned it down.

Doctor Who
In 1966, Doctor Who producer Innes Lloyd looked for a replacement for William Hartnell in the series' lead role. The continued survival of the show depended on audiences accepting another actor in the role, despite the bold decision that the replacement would not be a Hartnell lookalike or soundalike. Lloyd later stated that Hartnell had approved of the choice, saying, "There's only one man in England who can take over, and that's Patrick Troughton". Lloyd chose Troughton because of his extensive and versatile experience as a character actor. After he was cast, Troughton considered various ways to approach the role, to differentiate his portrayal from Hartnell's amiable-yet-tetchy patriarch. Troughton's early thoughts about how he might play the Doctor included a "tough sea captain", and a piratical figure in blackface and turban. Doctor Who creator Sydney Newman suggested that the Doctor could be a "cosmic hobo" in the mould of Charlie Chaplin, and this was the interpretation eventually chosen. Troughton was the first Doctor to have his face appear in the opening titles of the show. In one serial, The Enemy of the World, Troughton played two parts: as the protagonist (The Doctor) and the antagonist (Salamander). 

During his time on the series, Troughton tended to shun publicity and rarely gave interviews. He told one interviewer, "I think acting is magic. If I tell you all about myself it will spoil it". Years later, he told another interviewer that his greatest concern was that too much publicity would limit his opportunities as a character actor after he left the role.

In a rare interview with Ernest Thompson from Radio Times Troughton revealed that he "always liked dressing up, and would have been happy as a school teacher as children keep one young". Troughton was popular with both the production team and his co-stars. Producer Lloyd credited Troughton with a "leading actor's temperament. He was a father figure to the whole company and hence could embrace it and sweep it along with him". Troughton also gained a reputation on set as a practical joker.

Many of the early episodes in which Troughton appeared were among those discarded by the BBC. Troughton found Doctor Who'''s schedule (at the time, 40 to 44 episodes per year) gruelling, and decided to leave the series in 1969, after three years in the role. This decision was also motivated in part by fear of being typecast.Howe, Stammers and Walker p. 75

Troughton returned to Doctor Who three times after formally leaving the programme. The first of these occasions was in The Three Doctors, the 1972–73 serial opening the programme's 10th series. In 1983, Troughton overcame some reluctance to reprise his role and agreed to appear in the 20th anniversary special The Five Doctors at the request of series producer John Nathan-Turner. He also agreed to attend Doctor Who conventions, including the show's 20th anniversary celebrations at Longleat in 1983. He also appeared around the world with Nathan-Turner. Troughton enjoyed the return to the programme so much that he readily agreed to appear one more time as the Second Doctor, with Colin Baker's Sixth Doctor in The Two Doctors (1985). Reportedly, he also advised Fifth Doctor actor Peter Davison to limit his time in the role to three series to avoid typecasting and the younger actor followed this advice.

In 2013, the BBC commissioned a docudrama about the early days of Doctor Who, as part of the programme's fiftieth anniversary celebrations. Troughton appears as a character in the production, called An Adventure in Space and Time, portrayed by actor Reece Shearsmith.

In 2014's "Robot of Sherwood", a still image of Troughton from 1953 appears among the future depictions of Robin Hood displayed by the Twelfth Doctor to the outlaw.

Later career

After Troughton left Doctor Who in 1969, he appeared in various films and television roles. Film roles included Clove in Scars of Dracula (1970), a bodysnatcher in Frankenstein and the Monster from Hell (1973), Father Brennan in The Omen (1976) and Melanthius in Sinbad and the Eye of the Tiger (1977). Television roles included the recurring role of Thomas Howard, 3rd Duke of Norfolk in five of the six episodes of The Six Wives of Henry VIII (1970) (for which he commenced rehearsals just one week after completing his final studio recording on Doctor Who), the villainous Nasca in Thames Television's Aztec-themed drama The Feathered Serpent (1976–78), a guest starring spot in the comedy series The Goodies in the episode "The Baddies", as well as episodes of Paul Temple, Dr. Finlay's Casebook, Doomwatch, The Persuaders!, A Family at War, Coronation Street, Softly, Softly: Taskforce, Colditz, Play for Today, Z-Cars, Special Branch, Sutherland's Law, The Sweeney, Jason King, Survivors, Crown Court, Angels, Warship, Van der Valk, Space: 1999, The Onedin Line, All Creatures Great and Small, Only When I Laugh (Series 2 Episode #9), Nanny and Minder (in a March 1984 episode entitled "Windows", Season 4 Episode 9). He also portrayed Cole Hawlings in a BBC Television dramatisation of the John Masefield children's book The Box of Delights (1984). In the same year he also appeared in a Two Ronnies Christmas Special playing a judge.

Troughton's health was never completely robust due to heavy drinking and smoking (he had quit smoking in the 60s, but the damage had already been done). Later in his life he refused to accept his doctor's advice after he had developed a serious heart condition through overwork and stress. He suffered two major heart attacks, one in 1979 and the other in 1984, both of which prevented him from working for several months afterwards. Following each of these attacks, his doctor's warnings were again ignored as Troughton committed himself to a heavy TV and film schedule.

He featured in the 1974 11-part radio adaptation of Evelyn Waugh's Sword of Honour. In 1986, he was a regular in the first series of the LWT sitcom The Two of Us, and guested in an episode of Super Gran in May 1987, which was the last role he filmed. His final television appearance was in the autumn of the same year in Knights of God, which had been filmed two years earlier. Troughton also appeared in the first episode of Central Independent Television's Inspector Morse, entitled "The Dead of Jericho", which was originally transmitted on ITV on 6 January 1987.

Personal life
Troughton married his first wife, Margaret Dunlop, at the Union Church at Mill Hill on 3 September 1943.

Troughton started living a double life when, just after the birth of his third child in 1955, he chose to leave Dunlop and their three children (then aged eight, five, and a few months) to live with girlfriend Ethel Margaret "Bunny" Nuens, with whom he also went on to have three children. Troughton maintained the deception of having stayed with his original family that was so successful that his own mother died unaware of the separation in 1979, 24 years after Troughton had left Dunlop. Due to the disastrous drama Troughton caused during his divorce from Dunlop, his first daughter, Joanna, vowed never to speak to her father again. Their differences remained unresolved at the time of his death in 1987. While Troughton never married Nuens, in 1976 he did marry Shelagh Holdup and acquired two stepchildren.

Troughton's six children are:
 Joanna Troughton, (born 1947, to Troughton and Dunlop), author and illustrator of children's books
 David Troughton, (born 1950, to Troughton and Dunlop), actor
 Michael Troughton, (born 1955, to Troughton and Dunlop), actor
 Jane Troughton, (born 1956, to Troughton and Nuens), attended The Queens School, Kew. From 1960-
 Peter Troughton, (born 1957, to Troughton and Nuens)
 Mark Troughton, (born 1959, to Troughton and Nuens)

Troughton's grandchildren include:
Sam Troughton (son of David Troughton), an actor, known for Robin Hood.
Jim Troughton (son of David Troughton), played professional cricket for Warwickshire 
William Troughton (son of David Troughton), an actor who plays Tom Archer in The ArchersHarry Melling (son of Joanna Troughton), an actor, known for Dudley Dursley.

Death
On 27 March 1987, two days after his 67th birthday, Troughton was a guest at the Magnum Opus Con II science fiction convention in Columbus, Georgia, United States.
Although he had been warned by his doctors before leaving the United Kingdom not to exert himself because of his heart condition, he appeared to be in good spirits and participated vigorously in the day's panels, and was looking forward to a belated birthday celebration which was planned for that evening, as well as screenings of all of his surviving complete Doctor Who stories, including The Dominators, which he was particularly eager to see again. Troughton suffered a third and final heart attack at 7:25 am on 28 March, just after ordering breakfast from the hotel. According to the paramedics who attended the scene, he died instantly.

Troughton was certified dead at the Medical Center (now Piedmont Columbus Regional) in Columbus, Georgia. After a local cremation, his ashes were flown back to England. During the passage to England, the ashes were mislaid temporarily. This delayed his funeral by a few weeks. His widow, Shelagh, later scattered them beneath a newly planted tree in Bushy Park, a favourite place of Troughton's near to his family home in Teddington.

Filmography

Film

Television

Video games

References

Further reading
 Roderick Braithwaite. "'Strikingly Alive', The History of the Mill Hill School Foundation 1807–2007"; published Phillimore & Co. 
 Haining, Peter & British Broadcasting Corporation 1984, Doctor Who : the key to time : a year-by-year record, W.H. Allen, London. 
Howe, David J., Mark Stammers and Stephen James Walker. Doctor Who: The Sixties. London: Virgin Publishing, 1993. .
Troughton, Patrick. Interview with Terry Phillips. KTEH, San Jose, California. 1985.
 Troughton, Michael "Patrick Troughton, by his son Michael Troughton"; published by https://www.michaeltroughton.co.uk 
Vahimagi, Tise.  British Television: An Illustrated Guide''. Oxford: Oxford University Press / British Film Institute. 1994. .

External links

 Patrick Troughton Special Anniversary Edition
 
 Into The Unknown – Patrick Troughton article at Kasterborous.com
 Patrick Troughton Biography – British Film Institute

1920 births
1987 deaths
20th-century English male actors
English emigrants to the United States
English male film actors
English male Shakespearean actors
English male stage actors
English male television actors
Male actors from London
People educated at Mill Hill School
People from Mill Hill
Royal Navy officers of World War II
Royal Naval Volunteer Reserve personnel of World War II
Shipwreck survivors
Troughton family